Outward Bound is a 1930 American pre-Code drama film based on the 1923 hit play of the same name by Sutton Vane. It stars Leslie Howard, Douglas Fairbanks Jr., Helen Chandler, Beryl Mercer, Montagu Love, Alison Skipworth, Alec B. Francis, and Dudley Digges. The film was later remade, with some changes, as Between Two Worlds (1944).

Plot
Henry and Ann, a pair of young lovers, are planning to commit suicide and are worried about what will happen to their dog when they are gone. The scene then changes to a disparate group of passengers who find themselves aboard a darkened, fog-enshrouded crewless ship, sailing to an unknown destination.

Their stories are revealed one by one. Tom Prior, a prodigal son, discovers that he's traveling with his ex-boss, Mr. Lingley, a captain of industry; his mother, Mrs. Midget, whose identity is unknown to him, is curious about how her son is doing; Mrs. Cliveden-Banks, an affected socialite, chats with Scrubby the steward; Rev. William Duke, a clergyman, is keen about his missionary work in the London slums; and the young couple, Henry and Ann, who are facing an impossible love affair and have decided that they cannot live without each other. They now wonder if they will be together forever.

In time, the passengers slowly realize what is going on—they are all dead. They will be judged during the course of the voyage, and go either to Heaven, or to Hell. Arriving at their destination, they await judgment by Thompson, the "examiner."

Henry and Ann, who made a suicide attempt, now hover in a sort of limbo between life and death, have not quite crossed over. Scrubby, the ship's steward, has already been condemned to sail the ship for eternity, having previously committed suicide himself. Henry is eventually saved from asphyxiation by gas poisoning when his dog breaks a window pane. He calls to Ann, she revives, and together they are rescued by neighbors and taken away in an ambulance.

Cast

Leslie Howard as Tom Prior
Douglas Fairbanks Jr. as Henry
Beryl Mercer as Mrs Midget
Dudley Digges as Thompson
Helen Chandler as Ann
Alec B. Francis as Scrubby
Montagu Love as Mr Lingley
Lyonel Watts as Reverend William Duke
Alison Skipworth as Mrs Cliveden-Banks
Walter Kingsford as The Policeman (uncredited)

Production
Leslie Howard played the role of Henry in the stage production of Outward Bound which ran at the Ritz Theatre in New York City January 7 – May 10, 1924. Dudley Digges, Beryl Mercer and Lyonel Watts all reprised their roles for the film. Alfred Lunt played Tom Prior and Margalo Gillmore played Ann. In the film, Howard took Lunt's part and Douglas Fairbanks Jr. played the role originally performed by Howard.

"I never saw all of it," said Fairbanks about the film. "It gave me the creeps. Still does, just thinking about it. It was a prestige picture, never made a cent."

Preservation 
The film survives intact and has been broadcast on television and cable (Turner Classic Movies) from United Artists Associated. It is preserved in the Library of Congress collection.

References

External links 

1930 films
1930s fantasy drama films
American black-and-white films
American fantasy drama films
American films based on plays
Films about the afterlife
Films directed by Robert Milton
Films set on ships
Warner Bros. films
1930s English-language films
1930s American films